The Rohrersville Cornet Band, part of Maryland's cornet band heritage, claims to be the oldest continually-performing community band in the state, having been founded in 1837; it now performs in a dedicated music hall in Rohrersville, Maryland.

References 
Official site

American instrumental musical groups